The 2000 Nippon Professional Baseball season was the 51st season since the NPB was reorganized in 1950.

Regular season standings

Central League

Pacific League

Japan Series

Yomiuri Giants (4) vs. Fukuoka Daiei Hawks (2)

See also
2000 Major League Baseball season

References

 
2000 in baseball
2000 in Japanese sport